Hathyar is a 1989 Indian Hindi-language action crime film written and directed by J. P. Dutta. It features an ensemble cast of Dharmendra, Sanjay Dutt, Rishi Kapoor, Amrita Singh, Sangeeta Bijani, Asha Parekh, Paresh Rawal and Kulbhushan Kharbanda. The film focuses on how poverty forces a youngster (Dutt) to turn to crime by joining forces with the biggest don in town (Dharmendra), much to the chargin of his mother (Parekh), his lover (Singh) and his friend and the don's brother (Kapoor).

The film released worldwide on 10th March 1989 and was a critical and moderate commercial success. Over time, it has been considered as one of Dutta's best films, which probably gave the best description about the underworld.

Plot
Avinash (Sanjay Dutt) and his parents (Kulbhushan Kharbanda, Asha Parekh) come to Bombay where they miserably scrape along. Sometimes their acquaintance with Samiulla Khan (Rishi Kapoor), the younger brother of the underworld crime lord Khushal Khan (Dharmendra), is quite helpful as Sami, who refuses to deal with his brother's business, enjoys a good reputation. But after some bitter experiences, Avinash's father cannot stand his poor situation anymore and commits suicide. Now Avinash bears the responsibility to be the family's breadwinner which he, as he doesn't manage to find a job, is unable to fulfill. Desperately (and instigated by his friend  Satyajeet Puri (Pakya) from the local gang) he starts stealing. After having killed one of his victims, he gets more and more bogged down in the mire of crime – and gets into the rivalry between the gang bosses Khushal Khan and Rajan Anna (Paresh Rawal).

Cast
Dharmendra as Khushal Khan 
Rishi Kapoor as Samiulla Khan 
Sanjay Dutt as Avinash 
Kulbhushan Kharbanda as Avinash's Father 
Asha Parekh as Avinash's mother 
Paresh Rawal as Rajan 'Anna'
Satyajeet as Pakya  
Amrita Singh as Suman
Sangeeta Bijlani as Jenny
Shyama
Navtej Hundal
Avtar Gill as Khushal Khan's Advocate
Puneet Issar as Rajan Anna's Henchman
Mahesh Anand as Afzal (Khushal Khan's Henchman)
Satyajeet Puri and Javed Khan Amrohi  as  Pickpocketers
Iftekar as  Don
Ram Mohan as Mishra Ji

Production
This was the first film signed by Sangeeta Bijlani.

Songs
Composed by Laxmikant–Pyarelal and written by Hasan Kamal
"Der Aaye Dursat Aaye v1" - Kavita Krishnamurthy
"Der Aaye Dursat Aaye v2" - Kavita Krishnamurthy
"Jalwa Dekhoge Kya Ji" - Alisha Chinoy
"O Senor O Senor" - Anuradha Paudwal, Shailendra Singh

Reception
Parekh was noted for her performance. According to Encyclopedia of Indian Cinema, the film is Dutta's best known film, and it "extended the ancestral conflict into Bombay's gang wars". According to Sukanya Verma of The Hindu, the film was one of several "Rajasthan-based feudal dramas" by Dutta which "stood tall on a mass of machismo".

References

External links
 

1980s Hindi-language films
1989 films
1989 action films
Films scored by Laxmikant–Pyarelal
Films directed by J. P. Dutta
Indian action films